Per Bolund (born 3 July 1971) is a Swedish politician for the Green Party. He served as Deputy Prime Minister of Sweden (in a strictly ceremonial role) and as Minister for the Environment from February to November 2021, and has been co-spokesperson of the Green Party since May 2019.

He previously served as Minister for Financial Markets from October 2014 to February 2021 and as Minister for Housing from January 2019 to February 2021. He was shortly acting Minister for Housing and Urban Development from April to May 2016.

Bolund was elected to the Riksdag in 2006. As Minister for the Environment he made a pledge to double Sweden's climate finance. As leader of the  Green Party his withdrawal of support helped bring down the government of Magdalena Andersson in November 2021 because the planned tax cut on petrol in her first budget would lead to higher emissions.

Before politics he trained as a biologist, and his parents are the Aarhus University geneticist Professor Lars Bolund and medical Professor Christina Bolund. In his personal time he is a fan of baseball and football, and follows the Stockholm club AIK Fotboll.

References

External links

|-

|-

|-

|-

|-

|-

|-

|-

|-

|-

Members of the Riksdag from the Green Party
1971 births
Living people
Swedish Ministers for Housing
Swedish biologists
Members of the Riksdag 2022–2026